Saluggia (Salugia in Piedmontese) is a comune (municipality) in the Province of Vercelli in the Italian region Piedmont, located about  northeast of Turin and about  southwest of Vercelli, near the Dora Baltea river.

It is known in Italy and abroad for the production of beans and for having a storage site for nuclear wastes.

Twin towns
 Russi, Italy

References

External links
Official website 

Cities and towns in Piedmont